Connor Ballenden (born 29 March 1999) is an Australian rules footballer who plays for the  in the Australian Football League (AFL).

Early football
Connor was born in New Zealand to father Gavin, who represented South Africa in rugby union and mother Gail, who represented New Zealand in athletics. He moved with his family to Australia when he was four. He played junior football for the Kenmore Australian Football Club. Balleneden joined the ' academy at the age of 12. He also represented the Allies in the AFL Under 18 Championships for the 2016 and 2017 seasons. He completed school at St Joseph's College, Gregory Terrace in 2016.

AFL career
On debut, Ballenden picked up six disposals, kicked a goal and took three marks. Ballenden was temporarily removed from the senior list in November 2020, with plans to add him back to the rookie list at a later point. Ballenden was delisted at the end of the 2021 AFL season, after playing just 3 career games.

Statistics
 Statistics are correct to the end of 2020

|- style="background-color: #eaeaea"
! scope="row" style="text-align:center" | 2018
|  || 38 || 0 || — || — || — || — || — || — || — || — || — || — || — || — || — || —
|-
! scope="row" style="text-align:center" | 2019
|  || 38 || 0 || — || — || — || — || — || — || — || — || — || — || — || — || — || —
|- style="background-color: #EAEAEA"
! scope="row" style="text-align:center" | 2020
|style="text-align:center;"|
| 38 || 2 || 1 || 1 || 5 || 4 || 9 || 5 || 1 || 0.5 || 0.5 || 2.5 || 2.0 || 4.5 || 2.5 || 0.5
|- style="background:#EAEAEA; font-weight:bold; width:2em"
| scope="row" text-align:center class="sortbottom" colspan=3 | Career
| 2
| 2
| 1
| 5
| 4
| 9
| 5
| 1
| 0.5
| 0.5
| 2.5
| 2.0
| 4.5
| 2.5
| 0.5
|}

References

External links

1999 births
Living people
Australian rules footballers from Queensland
Brisbane Lions players